Nijat Sultan (born October 1956) is a Chinese politician of Uyghur ethnicity who is the current vice chairman of the Standing Committee of the People's Congress of Xinjiang Uygur Autonomous Region.

Biography
Nijat Sultan was born in Artux, Xinjiang, in October 1956. During the late Cultural Revolution, he was a sent-down youth in Ürümqi. In November 1978, he became a warehouse keeper in Xinjiang Agricultural Machinery Bureau Supply Station and was transferred to the Land Bureau of Xinjiang Uygur Autonomous Region in May 1985. He joined the Chinese Communist Party in February 1987. He was deputy head of the Audit Office of Xinjiang Uygur Autonomous Region in October 2005, and held that office until March 2008, when he was promoted to become head of the Department of Communications of Xinjiang Uygur Autonomous Region. In January 2015, he was elevated to vice chairman of the Standing Committee of the People's Congress of Xinjiang Uygur Autonomous Region. He also served a short term as chairman of the Xinjiang Federation of Trade Unions from May 2015 to November 2016.

References

1956 births
Living people
People from Artux
Uyghur politicians
Renmin University of China alumni
Central Party School of the Chinese Communist Party alumni
People's Republic of China politicians from Xinjiang
Chinese Communist Party politicians from Xinjiang